The term "overseas service station" and the associated phrase "Overseas 110" or "110 Overseas" (alluding to China's emergency number for the police, 110) refers to various illegal offices established by China's Ministry of Public Security in other countries. Spokespeople for the Chinese government have stated they were established to provide Chinese nationals in foreign countries with bureaucratic assistance, such as document renewals, and to fight transnational crime, such as online fraud.

In 2022, controversy emerged when a document about the stations was published by human rights group Safeguard Defenders. Safeguard Defenders alleged these offices had been used to intimidate Chinese dissidents and criminal suspects abroad, in order to convince them to return to China. The report led to investigations of the stations by the governments of several countries.

History

Allegations by Safeguard Defenders

According to Matt Schrader writing for the Jamestown Foundation, "overseas Chinese service stations" were first established in 2014, with 45 centers in 39 countries having been opened by 2019. According to Schrader, the centers were mostly formed from existing united front organizations and did not have policing authority. Schrader further stated that the centers served several legitimate purposes despite criticism of them, such as assisting crime victims with dealing with the host country's police and integrating new immigrants. Schrader pointed to a lack of transparency around the relationship between the centers and the Chinese government, particularly personnel of the United Front Work Department, and their political influence operations.

According to the organization Safeguard Defenders, the Nantong police department later set up the first "overseas service stations", associated with the phrase "110 Overseas" as part of a pilot project in 2016. Safeguard Defenders said the department set up offices in six countries and having solved at least 120 criminal cases that involved Chinese nationals as well as detaining over 80 people in Myanmar, Cambodia and Zambia. Dutch organizations RTL News and "Follow the Money" reported that afterwards, Wenzhou's Public Security Department established a "contact point" in Sydney, Australia and the Lishui bureau established two offices in the Netherlands (one in Amsterdam, another in Rotterdam) in 2018. According to their report, the police agencies of Fuzhou and Qingtian counties would set up the most numerous of the offices, with the latter beginning their program in 2019. Radio Free Asia reported that as of October 2022, a total of 54 such stations had been established in 30 countries.

Safeguard Defenders released a report in September 2022, alleging that the police stations were part of a program named Operation Fox Hunt, and were used to harass and coerce individuals wanted by the Chinese government, including dissidents, via threats to their families and themselves, pressuring them to return to China where they would then be detained. Safeguard Defenders claimed that, between April 2021 and July 2022, the Chinese government recorded 230,000 "suspects of fraud" who were "persuaded to return". The group stated that the stations violated the sovereignty of host countries by allowing Chinese police to circumvent police cooperation rules and procedures. For instance, Wang Jingyu, a dissident who fled China after being targeted for social media posts and was granted asylum in the Netherlands, claimed he had been threatened and sent harassing messages by the Rotterdam station to make him return to China, with his parents who remained in China being targeted. A broader example was a notice issued by an overseas station operated by the government of Laiyang in Myanmar, which stated that Chinese nationals who were there illegally should return to China or "there would be consequences for their loved ones", such as cancellation of their state benefits. An anonymous official from the Chinese Ministry of Foreign Affairs, in an interview with El Correo, stated that the stations used "persuasion" tactics to convince those wanted by the government to return to China, pointing to the difficulties of getting European states to extradite to China.

Criticism of report
According to Yale legal scholar and China expert Jeremy Daum, the document published by Safeguard defenders relied upon mistranslations of the Chinese language. For instance, the report's authors incorrectly translated a Chinese document describing a police task force operating within Yunnan Province, believing instead that the task force was "heading abroad." The mistranslation led Safeguard Defenders to assume local police actions within China were occurring in foreign countries. Daum stated that the stations opened abroad are not staffed by police officers, and are not clandestine. Instead, they actively advertise their services, primarily facilitating business within and outside China. Chinese dissidents living outside of China criticized Jeremy Daum's interpretation of the function of the overseas police service stations.

Chinese government reaction
According to the Chinese government, the centers had been set up to allow Chinese nationals to access administrative services such as driver license and other document renewals without having to travel to China, particularly during the COVID-19 pandemic, and to confront transnational crime, especially fraud, affecting overseas Chinese communities. In May 2022, China Youth Daily claimed that the stations operated by Fuzhou authorities had received over 1,800 reports from 88 countries.

Reactions by other governments
In response, some countries, including the United States, Canada, the United Kingdom, Spain, Portugal, and the Netherlands, announced they would investigate the stations. The overseas service stations in Dublin were ordered to close by the Irish Ministry of Foreign Affairs in late October 2022, although one had already stopped operations and took down its sign earlier when electronic ID renewal procedures were introduced. The Dutch Ministry of Foreign Affairs also stated that, as the Chinese government had failed to notify the country about the stations through diplomatic means, they had been operating illegally, with further investigation to be conducted into their conduct. Foreign minister Wopke Hoekstra later ordered both offices to close. In November 2022, Canada summoned the Chinese ambassador Cong Peiwu and issued a "cease and desist" warning concerning the stations. In December 2022, Italy announced that its police would cease joint patrols with Chinese police officers inside of Italian cities.

In January 2023, The New York Times reported that according to anonymous tipsters, counterintelligence agents from the Federal Bureau of Investigation raided a suspected station set up by Fuzhou municipal authorities, hosted in the offices of the American Changle Association in Chinatown, Manhattan in late 2022. The station was subsequently closed.

In March 2023, the Royal Canadian Mounted Police announced investigations into two police stations in Quebec. The same month, Taiwan's Overseas Community Affairs Council (OCAC) announced that a Chinese overseas police station in France engaged in cyberattacks against an OCAC language school in France.

In March 2023, Rita Schwarzelühr-Sutter stated that two police stations remain operational in Germany in violation of the country's sovereignty. She stated that they are run by "people who have good contacts with the diplomatic missions of the People's Republic of China and who enjoy the trust of the Chinese security authorities. They are also involved in Chinese United Front organizations."

Locations

See also 
 Chinese intelligence activity abroad
 Extraterritorial operation
 Operation Fox Hunt

References 

2014 establishments in China
Ministry of Public Security (China)
Chinese intelligence agencies
Foreign relations of China
Human rights abuses in China